Lena Margareta Wilton Nee Carlsson (born 21 May 1972) is a Swedish Olympic sailor. She finished 14th in the 470 event at the 1996 Summer Olympics together with Boel Bengtsson and 9th in the 470 event at the 2000 Summer Olympics together with Agneta Engström.

References

External links

Swedish female sailors (sport)
Olympic sailors of Sweden
470 class sailors
Royal Gothenburg Yacht Club sailors
Sailors at the 1996 Summer Olympics – 470
Sailors at the 2000 Summer Olympics – 470